Mbooni Location is an administrative area in Makueni County, Kenya. Mbooni location consists of two sub-locations namely Mutitu and Uthiuni. The Location is headed by a Chief who operates under the Ministry of interior and coordination of national government of Kenya.

References 

Kikima Mbooni

External links
 mindat

Populated places in Eastern Province (Kenya)
Makueni County